Seldes is a surname. Notable people with the surname include:

George Seldes (1890–1995), American journalist, editor, author, and media critic
Gilbert Seldes (1893–1970), American writer and cultural critic, brother of George
Marian Seldes (1928–2014), American actress, daughter of Gilbert